The 1988–89 Drexel Dragons men's basketball team represented Drexel University  during the 1988–89 NCAA Division I men's basketball season. The Dragons, led by 11th year head coach Eddie Burke, played their home games at the Daskalakis Athletic Center and were members of the East Coast Conference (ECC).

The team finished the season 12–16, and finished in 4th place in the ECC in the regular season.

Roster

Schedule

|-
!colspan=9 style="background:#F8B800; color:#002663;"| Regular season
|-

|-
!colspan=12 style="background:#FFC600; color:#07294D;"| ECC Tournament

Awards
John Rankin
ECC All-Conference First Team

Todd Lehmann
ECC All-Conference Second Team

References

Drexel Dragons men's basketball seasons
Drexel
1988 in sports in Pennsylvania
1989 in sports in Pennsylvania